Paul Barnett may refer to:

 Paul Barnett (bishop) (born 1935), ancient historian, New Testament scholar and former Anglican bishop
 Paul Barnett (producer) (born 1968), television producer and director
 Paul Barnett (swimmer) (born 1980), Australian Paralympic swimmer
 Paul Barnett (video game designer) (born 1970), English game designer
 John Grant (author) (Paul le Page Barnett, 1949–2020), Scottish science fiction and comics writer, also known as Paul Barnett